Elizabeth Kelly (born 29 March 1921) is a British actress, best known for her roles in television series and soap operas.

Career
She started acting on television in the late 1960s. She played Edie Burgess in the popular ITV soap opera Coronation Street in 1971 and went on to have roles in many televised dramas such as The Bill, Boon, Cider with Rosie, Spender, and Where the Heart Is among others.

She is best known for being a regular cast member of the BBC soap opera EastEnders. She played Nellie Ellis, the interfering relative of Pauline Fowler from 1993 to 1998, returning briefly in 2000 for Ethel Skinner's funeral.

Since leaving EastEnders she has appeared in episodes of The Inspector Lynley Mysteries, Emmerdale and Heartbeat.

Filmography

External links

1921 births
Living people
Actors from Scarborough, North Yorkshire
Actresses from Newcastle upon Tyne
English soap opera actresses
English television actresses